The James A. Walls House is a historic house on J. A. Walls Drive on the eastern fringe of Holly Grove, Arkansas. It is an irregularly-shaped -story wood-frame structure with a cross-gabled hip roof, projecting sections, and corner turret typical of the Queen Anne style. Its porch, supported by Tuscan columns, and front entry, with fanlight and pedimented bay, are typical of the Colonial Revival. Built in 1903 by a prominent local builder, is one of the community's finest examples of this transitional style.

The house was listed on the National Register of Historic Places in 1980.

See also
National Register of Historic Places listings in Monroe County, Arkansas

References

Houses on the National Register of Historic Places in Arkansas
Queen Anne architecture in Arkansas
Colonial Revival architecture in Arkansas
Houses completed in 1903
Houses in Monroe County, Arkansas
National Register of Historic Places in Monroe County, Arkansas